The Municipality of Nuevo Laredo is located in the Mexican state of Tamaulipas. Its municipal seat is Nuevo Laredo. The municipality contains more than 60 localities which the most important ones are Nuevo Laredo, El Campanario y Oradel, and Álvarez, the last two being suburbs of the city of Nuevo Laredo. By population, the municipality is the third largest in the state of Tamaulipas (behind Reynosa and Matamoros respectively). The Nuevo Laredo municipality is the northernmost in Tamaulipas, lying at the extreme northwestern tip of its narrow strip of land along the Río Grande. The city of Nuevo Laredo contains approximately 97.5% of the total population of the municipality.

Geography
Nuevo Laredo is located in the Northern tip of Tamaulipas on the west end of the Rio Grande Plains. Rio Grande is the only source that supplies its citizens with water. El Coyote Creek supplies Nuevo Laredo's only natural lake El Laguito (The Small Lake).  The area consists of a few hills and flat land covered with grass, oak, cacti, and mesquite.

Climate 
Nuevo Laredo features a semiarid climate. Nuevo Laredo's weather is influenced by its proximity to the Chihuahuan Desert to the west, by the Sierra Madre Oriental mountains to the south and west, and by the Gulf of Mexico to the east.  Much of the moisture from the Pacific is blocked by the Sierra Madre Oriental.  Therefore, most of the moisture derives from the Gulf of Mexico.  Its geographic location causes Nuevo Laredo's weather to range from long periods of heat to sudden violent storms in a short period of time. Nuevo Laredo is cold for Tamaulipas standards during winter, the average daytime highs are around 66 °F (19 C) and overnight lows around 43 °F (6 C); although it is rare for snow to fall in Nuevo Laredo, there was actually snow on the ground for a few hours on the morning of Christmas Day 2004.

As Laredo sometimes undergoes  drought, a water conservation ordinance was implemented in 2003.

Government 
Nuevo Laredo is governed by an elected Cabildo, which is composed of the Presidente Municipal (Municipal President or Mayor), two Síndicos,  and twenty Regidores. The PRI (Institutional Revolutionary Party) is in control of the city government. The Mayor is in charge of the municipal administration. The Síndicos supervise the municipal budget and expenditures, and the Regidores are elected by the party.

Public safety 
Public safety is provided by three municipal departments: (1) municipal police (Dirección de Seguridad Ciudadana), (2) traffic control (Dirección de Seguridad Vial), and (3) the emergency services department (Dirección de Protección Civil, Bomberos y Desastres).

Towns and villages
The largest localities (cities, towns, and villages) are:

Populated places

See also

Municipalities of Tamaulipas
Nuevo Laredo (City)
Tamaulipas

References

Nuevo Laredo
Mexico–United States border crossings